Danzhou Airport is an under-construction airport in approximately 25 km northeast of Nada, Danzhou, Hainan, China. It will be international-class, built to handle the increasing number of tourists visiting the area.

References

Airports in Hainan
Proposed airports in China